Obukhovka is a rural locality (a selo) in Starooskolsky District, Belgorod Oblast, Russia. The population was 1,159 as of 2010. There are 25 streets.

Geography 
Obukhovka is located 22 km southeast of Stary Oskol (the district's administrative centre) by road. Babaninka is the nearest rural locality.

References 

Rural localities in Starooskolsky District